Jaap Krijtenburg (born 16 May 1969 in Eindhoven) is a Dutch rower.

External links 
 
 

1969 births
Living people
Dutch male rowers
Sportspeople from Eindhoven
Olympic rowers of the Netherlands
Rowers at the 1992 Summer Olympics
World Rowing Championships medalists for the Netherlands
20th-century Dutch people
21st-century Dutch people